Kwan Mun Hau Tsuen or Kwan Mun Hau New Village is a village in the Tai Wo Hau are of Tsuen Wan District, Hong Kong.

Administration
Kwan Mun Hau New Village is a recognized village under the New Territories Small House Policy.

History
Kwan Mun Hau Tsuen, like the nearby villages of Ho Pui Tsuen and Yeung Uk Tsuen, is a resite village.

See also
 Tai Wo Hau station
 Tsuen Wan Sam Tsuen

References

External links

 Delineation of area of existing village Kwan Mun Hau (Tsuen Wan) for election of resident representative (2019 to 2022)

Villages in Tsuen Wan District, Hong Kong